Eupithecia duena is a moth in the  family Geometridae. It is found in Ecuador and Peru.

References

Moths described in 1899
duena
Moths of South America